James, Jim or Jimmy Saxton may refer to:

Jim Saxton (born 1943), American politician from New Jersey
Jimmy Saxton (born 1940), American football player
James Saxton (actor), see Braham Murray

See also
James Sexton, trade unionist and politician